Events from the year 1368 in Ireland.

Incumbent
Lord: Edward III

Events
 Thomas de Burley, Prior of the Order of St. John of Jerusalem appointed Lord Chancellor of Ireland

Births

Deaths

References

 
1360s in Ireland
Ireland
Years of the 14th century in Ireland